Tamarua is a Cook Islands electoral division, with one representative in the Cook Islands Parliament.  Its current representative is Tetangi Matapo, who has held the seat since winning a by-election in 2013.

The electorate consists of the district of Tamarua on the island of Mangaia.  It was created in 1981, when the Constitution Amendment (No. 9) Act 1980–1981 adjusted electorate boundaries and split the electorate of Mangaia into three.

Members of Parliament for Tamarua
Unless otherwise stated, all MPs terms began and ended at general elections.

Electoral results

References

Mangaia
Cook Islands electorates